Halmahera, formerly known as Jilolo, Gilolo, or Jailolo, is the largest island in the Maluku Islands.  It is part of the North Maluku province of Indonesia, and Sofifi, the capital of the province, is located on the west coast of the island.

It had a population of 162,728 in 1995; by 2010, it had increased to 449,938 for the island itself (excluding the tip which is considered part of the Joronga Islands, but including Gebe and Ju islands) and 667,161 for the island group (including all of South Halmahera and Tidore, but not Ternate). Approximately half of the island's inhabitants are Muslim and half are Christian.

History

Sparsely-populated Halmahera's fortunes have long been closely tied to those of the smaller islands of Ternate and Tidore, both off its west coast. These islands were both the sites of major kingdoms in the era before Dutch East India Company colonized the entire archipelago.

During World War II, Halmahera was the site of a Japanese naval base at Kao Bay.

In 1999 and 2000, Halmahera was the site of violence that began as a purely ethnic dispute between residents of (mainly Christian) Kao and (entirely Muslim) Malifut sub-districts and then took on a religious nature as it spread through much of the North Moluccas, called the Maluku sectarian conflict. Thousands of people on Halmahera were killed in the fighting between religious militias. In June 2000, about five hundred people were killed when a ferry carrying refugees from the fighting on Halmahera sank off the northeast tip of Sulawesi island. Conspiracy theories about this event abound. A memorial to this tragedy can be found in Duma village in North Halmahera district.

Today, much transportation to the rest of Indonesia is through connections on the provincial capital, Ternate island although Tobelo, the largest town on Halmahera, also has direct ferry and cargo sea links to Surabaya and Manado.

Particularly, since the inauguration of the first ever directly elected Bupati (Regent or District Head), Tobelo is undergoing rapid development and is aiming at rivaling Ternate's historical dominance. As it is surrounded by flat land, Tobelo has the potential for expansion. Ternate is limited by its size, being a small island which can be driven around in forty-five minutes. Also, in 2010, the provincial government has moved the provincial capital from Ternate City to Sofifi, a small village on the Halmahera coast opposite Tidore island.

North Maluku Province consists of eight regencies and two municipalities (cities); five of the regencies and one municipality include a part of Halmahera island. The regencies are North Halmahera, West Halmahera, East Halmahera, Central Halmahera, South Halmahera, Morotai, Sula Islands and Taliabu, while the municipalities are Ternate and Tidore Islands. Only Ternate Municipality, and Morotai, the Sula Islands and Taliabu regencies do not include any part of Halmahera.

Geology

The volcanic island lies on an island arc that includes the Raja Ampat Islands, all uplifted by the northward migration of the continent of Australia and subduction of the Pacific Plate. Dukono is an active volcano at the north end of the island. Mount Ibu is an active volcano on the island's northwest coast.

Ecology

The flightless invisible rail is endemic to the island. The recently discovered palm tree Jailoloa halmaherensis is also endemic to Halmahera.

The naturalist Alfred Russel Wallace visited Halmahera, as described in his 1869 book The Malay Archipelago. He considered the standardwing bird of paradise, Semioptera wallacei, to be his greatest prize. It was in February 1858, on the island of Ternate (or perhaps while on Halmahera itself), between bouts of fever, that Wallace came to the idea of natural selection via the survival of the fittest. Wallace wrote his ideas during the next couple of days, and sent the historical letter to Darwin.

Mining

Halmahera is the site of several mining projects.

PT Weda Bay Nickel operates a nickel and cobalt mining project in North and Central Halmahera Regencies, the Weda Bay Industrial Park.

Image gallery

References

External links 

Folk Orientation in Halmahera

 
Islands of the Maluku Islands
Landforms of North Maluku
Populated places in Indonesia
Islands of Indonesia